The 2013 Canadian Masters Curling Championships were held from April 8 to 14 at the Port Arthur Curling Club in Thunder Bay, Ontario.

Men

Teams
The teams are listed as follows:

Round-robin standings
Final round-robin standings

Round-robin results
All draw times are listed in Eastern Daylight Time (UTC−4).

Draw 2
Monday, April 8, 20:30

Draw 4
Tuesday, April 9, 12:00

Draw 6
Tuesday, April 9, 19:00

Draw 8
Wednesday, April 10, 12:00

Draw 10
Thursday, April 11, 8:30

Draw 12
Thursday, April 11, 15:30

Draw 14
Friday, April 12, 8:30

Draw 16
Friday, April 12, 15:30

Crossover Games
Saturday, April 13, 9:00

Playoffs

Semifinals
Saturday, April 13, 14:00

Bronze-medal game
Sunday, April 14, 14:00

Gold-medal game
Sunday, April 14, 14:00

Women

Teams
The teams are listed as follows:

Round-robin standings
Final round-robin standings

Round-robin results
All draw times are listed in Eastern Daylight Time (UTC−4).

Draw 1
Monday, April 8, 15:00

Draw 3
Tuesday, April 9, 8:30

Draw 5
Tuesday, April 9, 15:30

Draw 7
Wednesday, April 10, 8:30

Draw 9
Wednesday, April 10, 15:30

Draw 11
Thursday, April 11, 12:00

Draw 13
Thursday, April 11, 19:00

Draw 15
Friday, April 12, 12:00

Crossover Games
Friday, April 12, 19:30

Playoffs

Semifinals
Saturday, April 13, 14:00

Bronze-medal game
Sunday, April 14, 14:00

Gold-medal game
Sunday, April 14, 14:00

References

External links

Men's results
Women's results

2013 in Canadian curling
Curling in Northern Ontario
Sports competitions in Thunder Bay
2013 in Ontario
April 2013 sports events in Canada